Rivers of Babylon is a 1991 thriller novel by Peter Pišťanek.

The plot focuses on the criminal underworld of Bratislava, Slovakia, around the time of the Velvet Revolution. The characters - a collection of pimps, prostitutes and swindlers - are all seeking to make themselves a better life, which in each of their worlds means to deceive, use and destroy everyone around them. A villager, Rácz, is gradually caught up this world of greed, money and desire for power.

Movie adaptation 
A film of Rivers of Babylon was released in 1998 in Slovak. It was directed by Vladimir Balco and produced by Marian Urban. Music for the film was composed by Jaroslav Filip.

See also 
 Literature in Slovakia

References

External links 
Review of Rivers of Babylon in The Independent 25/01/08

1991 novels
Slovak literature
Novels set in Slovakia
Slovak novels adapted into films